Vernet-la-Varenne (Auvergnat: Le Vernet or Le Vernet de la Varena) is a former commune in the Puy-de-Dôme department in Auvergne in central France. On 1 January 2019, it was merged into the new commune Le Vernet-Chaméane.

See also
Communes of the Puy-de-Dôme department

References

Vernetlavarenne